Goucher College is a private liberal arts college in Towson, Maryland. It was chartered in 1885 by a conference in Baltimore led by namesake John F. Goucher and local leaders of the Methodist Episcopal Church. Goucher was a women's college until becoming coeducational in 1986. , Goucher had 1,480 undergraduates studying 33 majors and six interdisciplinary fields and 700 graduate students. Goucher also grants professional certificates in writing and education and offers a postbaccalaureate premedical program.

Originally situated in central Baltimore, Goucher moved to its current campus in downtown Towson in 1953. Goucher is a member of the Landmark Conference and competes in the NCAA's Division III in sports including lacrosse, tennis, soccer, volleyball, basketball, and horseback riding. Goucher is among the few colleges in the United States to require study abroad of all undergraduates and was one of forty institutions profiled in Colleges That Change Lives by Loren Pope. Its alumni include journalist Jonah Goldberg, former First Lady of Puerto Rico Lucé Vela, Judge Ellen Lipton Hollander of the District Court for the District of Maryland, 27th Vice Commandant of the United States Coast Guard Sally Brice-O'Hara, former president of First Republic Bank Katherine August-DeWilde, and the third president of California State University, San Marcos, Karen S. Haynes.

History

19th century 

In 1881, the Baltimore Conference of the Methodist Episcopal Church passed a resolution to found a seminary. The proposal was met with some objection, with one member stating, "I would not give a fig for a weakling little thing of a seminary. We want such a school, so ample in its provisions, of such dignity in its buildings, so fully provided with the best apparatus, that it shall draw to itself the eyes of the community and that young people shall feel it an honor to be enrolled among its students." Minister and conference member John B. Van Meter asserted "that the Conference [should] make the foundation and endowment of a female college the single object of its organized effort."

Van Meter was joined by fellow minister John Franklin Goucher (1845–1922) and together they eventually persuaded the conference to found a college, instead. Subsequently, the Women's College of Baltimore City ("City" was later dropped) was chartered on January 26, 1885. It opened its doors in 1888, and four years later graduated its first class of just five students.

John F. Goucher, despite being the school's namesake and co-founder, was not the college's first president. Although offered the post, he declined, and it went to William Hersey Hopkins, who had served as president of St. John's College in Annapolis.  After Hopkins resigned in 1890 to join the faculty, the board of trustees voted unanimously to renominate Goucher. Under pressure from the board, Goucher relented and accepted the position, which he held for nearly two decades. Goucher and his wife Mary Cecilia Fisher made significant financial contributions to the college, including the bequest of a portion of his estate.

20th century 
During President Goucher's tenure, enrollment grew but the college suffered financial deficits. In 1904, the college became the second in Maryland to establish a Phi Beta Kappa chapter, after Johns Hopkins University. Goucher stepped down in 1908 to resume his international missionary work but remained involved with the school as president emeritus until his death in 1922. In 1910, the school was renamed Goucher College in his honor.

In 1913, the college inaugurated its fourth president, William W. Guth, who oversaw the construction of several new residence halls and a successful million-dollar fundraising campaign.  Around this time, U.S. President Woodrow Wilson, whose daughter Jessie was a Goucher alumna, expressed support for the college's fundraising efforts in correspondence with the administration, writing in March 1913, "It would, indeed, be ... evidence that our great educational public does not fully understand its own interests if an institution which has served with such faithfulness ... in the cause of woman's [sic] education should be allowed to break up for the lack of money." By 1914, Goucher was one of six "Class I" colleges for women in the U.S.

In 1921, Goucher purchased 421 acres of land in nearby Towson that had belonged to the estate of a prominent Baltimore family for $150,000, some of which was later resold to provide funding for construction and other expenses. The move from Baltimore to the Towson suburbs was completed in 1953 after having been delayed by financial restraints imposed by the Great Depression and World War II.  Before 1950, Goucher hosted nearly a dozen sorority chapters on campus including Kappa Kappa Gamma, Kappa Alpha Theta, Gamma Phi Beta, and Pi Beta Phi. They were disbanded as of the move to Towson. Goucher turned coeducational in 1986 when the board of trustees voted to admit men, citing declining enrollment and reduced national interest by women in single-sex colleges. The decision was controversial among some students and alumnae, but was followed by increased enrollment and sustained support from the school's donors, with Goucher's endowment growing nearly five-fold from $45 million in 1986. Then-president Rhoda M. Dorsey, who also initially resisted the proposal, presided over the transition.

Old Goucher 

Goucher's former Baltimore campus is now known as Old Goucher. The school maintained no affiliation with the property after its sale. The complex was added to the National Register of Historic Places in 1978. Many of its Romanesque structures have been preserved and re-purposed for commercial, public, and residential use. The school's Towson campus was added to the historic register in 2007.

Campus
Goucher occupies a green, wooded  campus that is proximate and northeast to downtown Towson. Surrounding the central campus infrastructure is a dense forest, owned by the school, which features low hills and hiking and jogging trails. The non-denominational Haebler Memorial Chapel lies near the center of campus. A single road, Van Meter, connects to most of the college's residential, academic, recreational, and athletic buildings. Newsweek magazine described the campus as "unusually bucolic." It has also been referred to by CBS Baltimore as one of Baltimore County’s most scenic college campuses. A scene at the fictional Hammond University from the fourth season of the Netflix series House of Cards was filmed on Goucher's campus, with most shots taking place at the Athenaeum and the Rhoda M. Dorsey College Center.

Academic buildings 

Goucher's main academic buildings, including Van Meter Hall and Julia Rogers, are located at the northern portion of campus, called the "academic quad". The Hoffberger Science Building houses the school's science departments and is adjacent to the Meyerhoff Arts Building, which contains a theater, photo studio, and several galleries and out of which the dance, theater, and art departments are based. Student Administrative Services and the admissions office are located in the Rhoda M. Dorsey College Center. Near the center of the campus and opposite Mary Fisher Hall is the Athenaeum, or "the Ath," a  modern, multipurpose facility built in 2009, comprising the main library, an on-campus restaurant, exercise equipment, classrooms, lecture halls, and an open auditorium. The Athenaeum is where speakers who visit the campus are typically hosted. The Merrick Lecture Hall, a partial amphitheater situated near Van Meter Hall, is also a regular venue for on-campus recitals, performances, sponsored political debates, and other productions.

Housing and residential halls 

The college's residence halls are concentrated on the south side of campus. They are Heubeck, Froelicher, Stimson, Mary Fisher, Sondheim, Stimson, Welsh Hall, known by students as "the T" for its T-shaped design, which was completed in 2005, and the newer Pagliaro Selz Hall, completed in 2016. In 2018, the school completed construction of the "First-year Village" for freshmen. Campus housing for students includes singles, doubles, triples, suites, and on-campus apartments. Sondheim is the sole residence hall designated as substance-free. In July 2018, Goucher announced a campus-wide ban on cigarettes and all smoking devices, including electronic cigarettes.

Athletic and recreational facilities 
The campus's outdoor sports facilities include a 107,000 square foot turf stadium field known on campus as Gopher Stadium, a track, eight tennis courts as well as separate courts for racquetball and squash, and an equestrian center. The Decker Sports and Recreation Center contains a six-lane, 25-yard pool, dance studios, a basketball court, gymnasium, varsity locker rooms, a fully equipped weight room, and a cardio fitness center. The equestrian center lies on the northernmost edge of campus and contains a set of stables and a riding arena.

Design, layout, and sustainability 

The architectural design firm responsible for planning the campus, Moore and Hutchins, elected to group buildings together into informal zones based on function, departing from the Romanesque style of the previous Baltimore campus. The buildings on campus are clad in tan-colored Butler stone, which was chosen to reflect a Modernist theme. Over the years, the architecture of the campus has won numerous awards.  The campus has also been recognized for its commitment to sustainability and energy efficiency, being called a "Top 25 Green College." In 2009, Goucher announced a goal for all new and existing buildings to achieve at least a Silver rating according to the U.S. Green Building Council's Leadership in Energy and Environmental Design (LEED) green building certification system. In 2007, the campus was added to the National Register of Historic Places.

The campus underwent significant changes when in 2017 several of its primary residential buildings were relocated as part of an extensive plan to construct a "First-year Village" comprising modernized residential halls and recreational facilities for newly matriculated freshmen. The new freshmen dorms have a capacity of 450 and opened in the fall of 2018. These developments coincided with substantial renovations to Mary Fisher Hall, with its campus cafe upgraded to a full-fledged, 550-seat dining hall. Goucher also announced plans to build a new  Science Research Center to provide additional lab space and resources for expanded biology, chemistry, and environmental science departments. In order to raise capital for these projects, Goucher initiated a fundraising campaign to raise $100 million from alumni and other donors, of which it has raised $43 million to date.

Academics

Rankings and reputation 

In the U.S. News & World Report annual college rankings for 2021, Goucher tied for 120th among national liberal arts colleges, 11th in Most Innovative Schools, 72nd in Social Mobility, and 5th in Study Abroad. Forbes in 2019 ranked Goucher at 138 in Liberal Arts Universities, 161 in the Northeast, 272 nationally among private colleges, and 410 overall among the best 650 colleges and universities in the U.S. Washington Monthly ranked Goucher 67th among liberal arts colleges in 2019.

The Princeton Review included Goucher in its 2019 edition of the "Best 384 Colleges" and ranked it No. 5 in "Most Popular Study Abroad Program.” Goucher was recognized as a top producer of Fulbright scholars by The Chronicle of Higher Education in 2018. It was also profiled in the book Colleges that Change Lives by Loren Pope as one of forty institutions. The school was one of the first in the country to require a study abroad of all undergraduates, along with Susquehanna University and Soka University of America.

Admissions 
Goucher's admissions process is rated as "selective" by U.S. News & World Report. For the class of 2022, Goucher received 3,474 applications and had an acceptance rate of 79%. Goucher has been SAT-optional since 2006.

In 2014, the school received national coverage when it announced it would accept video-only applications without transcripts, essays, or test scores. The decision was criticized by some who suggested that doing so represented a lowering of standards. The school defended the decision as part of an effort to increase diversity among the student body and later reported that the average GPA of students admitted via the video application process met or exceeded that of students who submitted traditional applications. For 2021, the average matriculated student's GPA was 3.14, with those reporting, the average SAT score was 1200, and average ACT score was 25.

Undergraduate level

As of 2018, students choose from 33 different majors and six interdisciplinary programs; there are also special orientation courses for first-year students. The most popular majors are in the humanities and social sciences, languages, biological sciences, and performing arts. Goucher is also well-known for its creative writing, dance, and pre-med departments. The student-faculty ratio is 10:1, and the average class size is 17. Goucher is accredited by the Middle States Commission on Higher Education.

Goucher began requiring all undergraduates to study abroad in 2006, which was the most notable of several reforms to the school's curriculum in that period. A popular choice for students is a three-week course abroad during the winter, spring, or summer. Goucher offers over 60 semester and yearlong study-abroad programs in 30 countries but allows students to register in programs by other schools. Undergraduates are also expected to either complete an internship, participate in community engagement work, or work as a faculty research assistant. Goucher sponsors a competitive grant program for students participating in summer internships.

In 2017, Goucher instituted a revamped set of general education requirements into the curriculum called "Goucher Commons" including a first-year seminar, emphasis on writing, data analytics, and foreign language and culture, a capstone course, and inquiry into at least two areas. In 2018, Goucher announced plans to eliminate seven majors, including mathematics, physics, religion, music, and Russian studies, following a "Program Prioritization Process" involving faculty which cited low overall interest in those majors among students. The school said that advanced courses in these subjects will remain part of the overall curriculum and that the class of 2022 and students that were studying in those majors will be unaffected by the change.

Graduate level

Goucher's graduate program is run out of the Welch Center for Graduate and Professional Studies, which is named for late former acting president Robert S. Welch. The school grants Master of Arts, Master of Education, and Master of Fine Arts degrees in fields including art and technology and historic preservation.

Certificate and other programs
Since 1993, Goucher has offered a full-time post-baccalaureate pre-medical program with 96% of students over the course of its history gaining acceptance to medical school and 99.7% over the past decade. The program accepts approximately 32 students annually. It has linkage agreements with several schools including the University of Pennsylvania, Pritzker School of Medicine, University of Michigan, Alpert Medical School, George Washington University School of Medicine & Health Sciences, Weill Cornell Medicine, Stony Brook, University of Maryland School of Medicine, Hofstra, and the University of Pittsburgh.

Goucher also grants certificates through a program for teachers called the AP (Advanced Placement) Summer Institute recognizing specialties with at-risk learners, middle school, reading instruction, improving school leadership, and educational technology.

In 2012, Goucher founded the Goucher Prison Education Partnership (GPEP), a division of the college that expands the academic community to include individuals incarcerated in two Maryland state prisons. In 2015, GPEP hosted the Department of Education at the Maryland Correctional Institution - Jessup (MCI-J) to announce the Second Chance Pell Grant pilot program and became one of 67 colleges selected in 2016 to provide individuals incarcerated in the U.S. the opportunity to use federal Pell grants to earn college credits. Goucher offers a bachelor's degree in American Studies to students enrolled through GPEP. The division primarily operates on private grants and donations raised by its staff, with some funds provided through federal Pell grants.

Student life

Clubs and extracurriculars
Goucher has over 60 student-run clubs including the Chem Club, which is the oldest continuously operating club on campus, Hillel, an a capella group called Red Hot Blue, a poetry club, a black student union called Umoja, Model United Nations, and a student-labor action committee. The college also publishes a bi-weekly student newspaper called The Quindecim and a literary arts journal called Preface. Other media run by the school is Goucher Student Radio, which contains a host of student, staff, and faculty programming and is streamed online. Many students also participate in Goucher Student Government, which holds elections, oversees the activities of clubs, passes resolutions, and votes on matters affecting the general student body. Similar to several other private liberal arts schools in the northeast, Goucher does not recognize any fraternities or sororities on campus.

Athletics

Goucher's athletic teams are known as the Gophers. In 2007 the college joined the Landmark Conference after competing as a member of the Capital Athletic Conference from 1991 to 2007. Goucher competes in the NCAA's Division III, fielding men's and women's teams in lacrosse, soccer, basketball, track and field, cross country, swimming, and tennis, as well as women's teams in field hockey and volleyball. Goucher also competes nationally in co-ed equestrian sports through the Intercollegiate Horse Show Association.

Demographics
Approximately 68% of undergraduates are female. About 35% of the student body identifies as African-American, Asian, Hispanic, or Native-American. Goucher also has one of the highest percentages of Jewish students in the country at 31% according to Hillel International. Goucher attracts students both nationally and internationally; undergraduates in 2017 came from 46 states and 50 countries. Twenty-five percent of students qualify for Pell Grants, and Goucher has been recognized for its success in graduating Pell Grant recipients as compared to the national average. For the class of 2021, the top five represented home states were Maryland, Pennsylvania, New York, New Jersey, and California, and 24% of the incoming class were first-generation college students.

Other activities on campus
Goucher has hosted the Johns Hopkins University Center for Talented Youth summer program for gifted students. The school also regularly conducts the Goucher Poll, which operates under the Sarah T. Hughes Field Politics Center. The polling is performed by Goucher students out of a 40-station computer-aided telephone interviewer lab. Goucher students are credited with conceiving the nationally popular campus game Humans vs. Zombies, which is organized by students annually, and the commercial party game Cards Against Humanity. Another of the school's annual traditions is known as GIG, "Get into Goucher," in which students participate in campus-wide celebrations, concerts, and other festivities. Goucher also hosts English as a second language and computer literacy classes under a program called the Futuro Latino Learning Center, run by students and college instructors.

Notable faculty and alumni
Well-known Goucher faculty and professors emeritus include Jean H. Baker and Julie Roy Jeffrey of the history department, Nancy Hubbard from the business and accounting department, president emeritus Sanford J. Ungar, and authors Madison Smartt Bell and Elizabeth Spires, who oversee the college's Kratz Center for Creative Writing.

Goucher has over 21,000 living alumni, and many of its graduates have gone on to make contributions in the arts and literature, sciences, journalism, business, academia, government, and other fields. Prominent alumni include conservative commentator and senior editor for the National Review Jonah Goldberg, 14th Baltimore County Executive John Olszewski, former First Lady of Puerto Rico Lucé Vela, 27th Vice Commandant of the United States Coast Guard Sally Brice-O'Hara, 26th Chief of Chaplains for the United States Navy Margaret G. Kibben, former president of Public Citizen Joan Claybrook, third president of California State University, San Marcos, Karen S. Haynes, former president of First Republic Bank Katherine August-DeWilde, federal judges Ellen Lipton Hollander for the United States District Court for the District of Maryland and Phyllis A. Kravitch for the U.S. Court of Appeals for the Eleventh Circuit, and former chairwoman of the United States International Trade Commission Paula Stern. Bessie Moses (graduated 1915) was founder of Baltimore's Bureau for Contraceptive Advice.

References

External links

Official athletics website

 
Former women's universities and colleges in Maryland
Liberal arts colleges in Maryland
Universities and colleges in Baltimore County, Maryland
Baltimore County, Maryland landmarks
Educational institutions established in 1885
Towson, Maryland
1885 establishments in Maryland
Historic districts in Baltimore County, Maryland
Historic districts on the National Register of Historic Places in Maryland
University and college buildings on the National Register of Historic Places in Maryland
National Register of Historic Places in Baltimore County, Maryland
Private universities and colleges in Maryland